Hors Satan (Outside Satan) is a 2011 French drama film written and directed by Bruno Dumont. It was filmed under the production title L'Empire, which means "The Empire". It premiered in the Un Certain Regard section at the 2011 Cannes Film Festival.

Cast
 David Dewaele as le gars
 Alexandre Lematre as la fille
 Valerie Mestdagh as la mère
 Sonia Barthelemy as la mère de la gamine
 Juliette Bacquet as la gamine
 Christophe Bon as le garde
 Dominique Caffier as l'homme au chien 
 Aurore Broutin as la routarde

Reception
Rob Nelson of Variety called Hors Satan "Another 'WTF?' film from Gallic writer-director Bruno Dumont", and went on: "Like Dumont's Twentynine Palms and Life of Jesus (give or take the Cannes Grand Prix-winning L'Humanité, Outside Satan flirts with all-out absurdity, as if managing to keep it at bay will be the director's own miracle, highly subject to interpretation. Less debatable are the film's technical merits, with d.p. Yves Cape delivering naturalistic beauty on a wide canvas, and the on-location sound work capturing every minute nuance of bird-chirps, cock-crows, and blasts of both wind and, uh, shotgun."

British film critic Peter Bradshaw of The Guardian gave the film 4 out of 5 stars, saying that "Bruno Dumont's film-making is just so fluent, unnerving, gripping; he is entirely unique". Lisa Schwarzbaum of Entertainment Weekly granted the film a B+ and called it an "austerely wild, religiously amoral drama... set in untamed northern coastal France," adding, "Dumont's rigorous, serious attention to the mysteries of good, evil, and faith rewards those willing to be confounded."

References

External links
 

2011 drama films
2011 films
Films directed by Bruno Dumont
French drama films
2010s French-language films
2010s French films